Kösterbeck may refer to:

 Kösterbeck (river), Germany
 Kösterbeck (nature reserve), Germany